Merchant Pshenichnikov's House is located in the historical center of Yekaterinburg, Sverdlovsk Oblast in Russia.

The building was granted the status of federal significance on August 30, 1960 (Council of Ministers of the RSFSR Decree № 1327). Its cultural heritage of regional significance object number is 661710759180005.

Architecture 
The two-story house was designed in the style of the classicism of the first half of the 19th century and has an elongated rectangular shape with a mezzanine.

The first floor is all horizontally indented in a rustic style. It is decorated with small ledges, one of which has a four-column Corinthian portico covering the second floor and reaching the mezzanine level. Between these columns is a balcony with wrought-iron and cast-iron bars.

The walls of the second floor are smooth, with niches above the windows. These niches, filled with stucco, are semicircular behind the portico and horizontal on the side.

References

Literature 
 

Tourist attractions in Sverdlovsk Oblast
Buildings and structures in Yekaterinburg
Cultural heritage monuments of regional significance in Sverdlovsk Oblast